Eduard Steinemann (2 August 1906 – 28 June 1937) was a Swiss gymnast who competed in the 1928 Summer Olympics and in the 1936 Summer Olympics.

References

1906 births
1937 deaths
Swiss male artistic gymnasts
Olympic gymnasts of Switzerland
Gymnasts at the 1928 Summer Olympics
Gymnasts at the 1936 Summer Olympics
Olympic gold medalists for Switzerland
Olympic silver medalists for Switzerland
Olympic medalists in gymnastics
Medalists at the 1936 Summer Olympics
Medalists at the 1928 Summer Olympics
20th-century Swiss people